Luis Naón (born 1961 in La Plata, Argentina) is a French-naturalised conductor, music educator, composer and musicologist.

Biography 
Naón studied at the National University of La Plata, the Pontifical Catholic University of Argentina and the Conservatoire de Paris.

References

External links 
 
 
 Naón, Luis on Centre de documentation de la musique contemporaine (Cdmc)
 , Luis Naón: Around the Bell (2012)

20th-century French composers
21st-century French composers
Conservatoire de Paris alumni
French music educators
20th-century French musicologists
21st-century French musicologists
1961 births
People from La Plata
Living people
National University of La Plata alumni
Pontifical Catholic University of Argentina alumni